The Embassy of Ukraine in Warsaw is the diplomatic mission of Ukraine in Poland.

History 
Poland recognised the independence of Ukraine on December 2, 1991.  Diplomatic relations were established on January 4, 1992. After the establishment of an independent Ukraine in 1991, the opened an office in Poland, sending a diplomat with the rank of "Special Envoy of the government," starting diplomatic relations. In 1992 it was raised to the rank of an embassy. Currently it is located in the building of the former USSR Trade Representation 7 Szucha, 00-580 Warsaw.

Ambassadors

 Olexander Karpynskyy (1918)
 Andriy Livytskyi (1919–1920)
 Isai Hurhin (1920)
 Mieczyslaw Loganovsky (1921)
 Alexander Shumsky (1921–1922)
 Gregory Besyedovskyy (1922–1923)
 Teodozij Starak (1991)
 Anatoly Shevchuk (1991–1992)
 Hennadiy Udovenko (1992–1994)
 Peter Sardachuk (1994–1998)
 Dmytro Pavlychko (1999–2002)
 Olexander Nikonenko (2002–2003)
 Ihor Kharchenko (2003–2005)
 Olexander Motsyk (2005–2010)
 Markiyan Malsky (2010–2014)
 Vladyslav Kanevsky (2014), сharge d'Affaires
 Andrii Deshchytsia (2014–2022)
 Vasyl Zvarych (since 2022)

See also 
 Poland-Ukraine relations
 Foreign relations of Poland
 Foreign relations of Ukraine
 Embassy of Poland in Kyiv
 Diplomatic missions of Ukraine

References

External links 
 Embassy of Ukraine in Warsaw

Warsaw
Ukraine
Poland–Ukraine relations